Leonard Hill may refer to:

Leonard Hill (physiologist) (18661952), British physiologist
Leonard Hill (politician) (fl. 193656), Australian politician
Leonard Hill (producer) (1947–2016), American television producer and real estate developer
Leonard Hill (athlete) (fl. 198586), American distance runner, winner of the  Portland Marathon in 1985 and in 1986
Leonard Lake (1945–1985), also known as Leonard Hill, American serial killer

See also 
Len Hill (disambiguation)
Leonard Hill (New York), a mountain in Schoharie County
Leonard Raven-Hill (18671942), English artist, illustrator and cartoonist.
Leonards Hill, Victoria, village located in the Shire of Hepburn, Victoria, Australia
Hill (surname)